Acanthonotozomopsis is a genus of crustaceans belonging to the monotypic family Vicmusiidae.

The species of this genus are found in southernmost Southern Hemisphere.

Species:

Acanthonotozomopsis duplocoxa 
Acanthonotozomopsis pushkini

References

Amphipoda